Synanthedon bibionipennis, the strawberry crown moth, is a moth of the family Sesiidae. It is found in western North America from Montana south to Texas westward to the Pacific coast and from British Columbia to California. It is an introduced species in Hawaii.

The wingspan is about 20 mm. Adults are on wing from April to August. There is one generation per year. Adults are brightly colored, with a black abdomen banded with yellow on the second, fifth and sixth abdominal segments.

The larvae feed on various rose species, including Fragaria, Rosa, Rubus and Potentilla. It is considered a pest of strawberries. The larvae are white with a brown head. They overwinter in the crowns and roots of their host plant.

External links
Images
Bug Guide
Susceptibility of the Strawberry Crown Moth (Lepidoptera: Sesiidae) to Entomopathogenic Nematodes

Sesiidae
Moths described in 1869